Lichtstadt Feldkirch ("City of Light Feldkirch") is a light art festival in Feldkirch in the Austrian state of Vorarlberg. It was first held in 2018. It is planned that the festival be held every two years.

The festival 
Lichtstadt Feldkirch is a four-day biennial light show in the city of Feldkirch. In the nighttime, ight installations are presented at ten different venues. Many of the projects are created for the respective location. The installations are free and barrier-free accessible."As a scene for light art, the urban space offers numerous unexplored possibilities to experience our present through architecture, light and technology, to break viewing habits or to illuminate the past. [...] Artistic development can be made possible and thus different thematic or technically innovative focal points can be set will." – Lichtstadt AssociationAsynchronous to the main events, the smaller "Spotlight" events have been taking place since 2020, each of which focuses on an artist or a group of artists.

The festival and the "Spotlight" series are organized by the non-profit association "Lichtstadt", which was founded in 2017.

Timeline

2023 
The 2021 edition will take place from 4–7 October 2023.

2021 
The 2021 edition took place from 6–9 October 2021. The international artists and artist collectives OchoReSotto, Peter Kogler, Brigitte Kowanz, David Reumüller, NEON GOLDEN, artificialOwl and DUNDU realized mappings, installations, projections and interactive works in the second edition.

2020 
The 2020 edition of the festival was postponed to 2021 due to COVID-19.

2018 
The first edition in 2018 was held to celebrate the 800th anniversary year of the city of Feldkirch. It took place from October 3 to 6, 2018. Ten projects by international artists, e.g. Ólafur Elíasson, transformed the old town into a large open-air museum at nightfall. Installations, sculptures, projections on facades and floor as well as laser projections, mappings and light objects were part of the light art festival.

See also 

 Poolbar Festival
 Schubertiade Vorarlberg
 Montforter Zwischentöne

References

External links 

 Official website (in German)

Light festivals
Festivals in Vorarlberg
Arts festivals in Austria
Feldkirch, Vorarlberg
Cultural festivals in Austria